truTV Presents: World's Dumbest... (formerly titled The Smoking Gun Presents: World's Dumbest...) is an American reality comedy television series produced by Meetinghouse Productions, Inc. and aired on truTV from 2008 to 2014.

Starting in 2022, TBD has aired reruns.

Overview

Early beginnings 
Each episode of the series, originally only known as World's Dumbest Criminals, presented a comedic look at 20 half-witted and offbeat events recorded on camera and occasionally, on tape by 911 dispatchers.

As the series expanded to offer humorous looks at other subjects, the episodes were classified by themes, such as criminals (later outlaws), drivers (later motorheads), daredevils (later thrillseekers), partiers, and performers. Since Season 7, the series produced several episodes centering around weird and humorous Inventions. These episodes forgoed the usual World's Dumbest title and replaced it with World's Smartest; possibly with a sarcastic undertone.

Each featured commentary from comedians and writers such as Bryan Callen, Jared Logan, Chris Fairbanks, Kevin and Tom McCaffrey, and others.

Because the show's original focus had solely been on criminals bungling their acts of crime, commentary used to be provided mostly by celebrities known for their own past brushes with the law, including Danny Bonaduce, Leif Garrett, Tonya Harding, Todd Bridges, Daniel Baldwin, Frank Stallone and Gary Busey. These individuals continued to appear on the show after its focus expanded.

Sound effects and mock commentary are added to enhance the humor of the events. A cartoon storyboard may be added to make up for the lack of video.

In January 2011, the show renamed itself as truTV Presents: World's Dumbest..., dropping the "Smoking Gun", with the commentators' on-screen ID logos, the episode's opening title page, and background brightness adjusted as well, in the process. The new title page and show name was retroactively applied to reruns of older episodes.

Cast members 
The series had a variety of celebrity cast members with backgrounds in acting, writing, journalism, improvisation, and comedy. Such cast members of the series included: Jaime Andrews, Mike Britt, Jessie Cantrell, Tom Shillue, Savannah Guthrie, Jack Ford, Harlan Coben, Natalie Desselle-Reid, Tom O'Riordan, Godfrey, Michel Bryant, Wesley Dening, Nick Di Paolo, John Enos, Daisy Gardner, Judy Gold, Billy Kimball, Ted Jessup, Vincent Pastore, Roger Lodge, Brad Loekle, Michael Loftus, Loni Love, Chuck Nice, Chelsea Peretti, Marianne Sierk, Chris Strait, Mike Trainor, Brendon Walsh, Gilbert Gottfried, Dan Cummins, Rachel Feinstein, Jamie Lee, Malachi Nimmons Jr., Mike O'Gorman, Brooke Van Poppelen, Annie Lederman, Katlyn Carlson, Nate Craig, Mark Normand, Amanda Landry, Kate Wolff, and The Greg Wilson.

Special episodes 
Some special episodes were produced following Season 9. Season 10 included World's Dumbest Bracket Showdown, which featured some of the best clips from seasons past in a March Madness-style elimination tournament bracket, with cast members voting on which clip was better. Season 16 presented World's Dumbest Only in America, which combined several different themed clips, all of which originated from the United States of America.

Finale 
After 16 seasons comprising 197 episodes spanning over six years, the series aired its final episode on March 2, 2014, with no direct indication that the series had been cancelled. Rumors were circulating about a potential series revival being produced, with the show's unverified Twitter page posting a cryptic tweet on January 11, 2021 after nearly four years of inactivity, but no confirmation was made official from the show's original network, the show's producers, or any of the former cast members. TruTV continued to air reruns of the show for over the length of the show's run for eight years, mainly on weekday afternoons and early Sunday mornings. However, TBD announced on their Facebook that they would start airing reruns on May 31, 2022.

Episodes of World's Dumbest...

Season One (March 2008 – July 2008)
Season one of TruTV Presents: World's Dumbest... premiered on March 13, 2008 on the truTV network.

Season Two (October 2008 – December 2008)

Season Three (January 2009 – March 2009)

Season Four (December 2008 – April 2009)

Season Five (June 2009 – August 2009)

Season Six (October 2009 – January 2010)

Season Seven (December 2009 – April 2010)

Season Eight (June 2010 – September 2010)

Season Nine (October 2010 – January 2011)

Halfway through Season 9, the show's title was changed from The Smoking Gun Presents: World's Dumbest.... to
TruTV Presents: World's Dumbest.....

Season Ten (January 2011 – May 2011)

Season Eleven (June 2011 – September 2011)

Season Twelve (October 2011 – February 2012)

Season Thirteen (February 2012 – May 2012)

Season Fourteen (June 2012 – September 2012)

Season Fifteen (February 2013 – August 2013)

Season Sixteen (October 2013 – March 2014)

References

External links
 

2008 American television series debuts
2014 American television series endings
2000s American police comedy television series
2010s American police comedy television series
2000s American reality television series
2010s American reality television series
2000s American video clip television series
2010s American video clip television series
English-language television shows
Television series by Warner Bros. Television Studios
TruTV original programming